Thomas Baker (6 February 1832 – 21 July 1867) was a Methodist missionary in Fiji, known as being the only missionary in the archipelago to be killed and eaten, along with seven of his Fijian followers. The incident occurred in the Navosa Highlands of western Viti Levu in July 1867, and the rock used to kill Baker is still displayed in the village of Nabutatau. The soles of his leather sandals, which were also cooked by the cannibal tribe, are preserved at the Fiji Museum in Suva. Records show that Baker was killed and eaten as a result of him touching a chief's head, which is considered disrespectful in Fijian culture.

Final mission
In July 1867, Baker led a party into the interior of Viti Levu, passing through the Taukei ni Waluvu's Christian enclave on the East bank of the Wainimala River. When Baker met a local chief of Navatusila, Baker presented a British comb as a gift and attempted to persuade him to convert to Christianity. When the chief refused, Baker decided to take his comb back, touching the chief's head as he did so, which was taken as a threat and offense in Fijian customs. In pursuing revenge, a chief of Naitasari, gave a tabua (whale tooth) to the clan to seal the plot to kill the party, and for the body of Thomas Baker to be cannibalised and distributed in the old traditional village of Nabialevu (Nadrau).

Baker was killed along with seven Fijian Christian workers. The Fijians who were cannibalized with Baker were: Setareki Seileka, Sisa Tuilekutu, Navitalai Torau, Nemani Raqio, Taniela Batirerega, Josefata Tabuakarawa, and Setareki Nadu. Two other men, Aisea and Josefa Nagata, escaped the massacre. After Baker's death, the Davuilevu mission was temporarily closed in 1868.

In 2003, Baker's relatives visited the village for a traditional matanigasau reconciliation ceremony. This was offered in apology for the killing by descendants of Baker's slayers.

Legacy
The story of Baker's death is the basis for Jack London's short story "The Whale Tooth".

In 1983, the American malacologist Alan Solem named the genus Vatusila "after the Fijian tribe (located at the headwaters of the Sigatoka River) that killed and ate Rev. Thomas Baker, a Wesleyan missionary, on July 21, 1867."

References

Methodist missionaries in Fiji
History of Fiji
Cannibalised people
1867 deaths
British people murdered abroad
People murdered in Fiji
Cannibalism in Oceania
1832 births
British expatriates in Fiji
19th-century Protestant martyrs
19th-century Methodists
1867 murders in Oceania